Dmitri Nikolaevich Torgovanov (born 5 January 1972) is a former Russian handball player and Olympic Champion from 2000 in Sydney.  He is currently a head coach for Neva. He was the head coach for the Russian national team between 2015 and 2017.

He received a bronze medal at the 2004 Summer Olympics in Athens with the Russian national team.

References

1972 births
Living people
Russian male handball players
Olympic handball players of Russia
Handball players at the 1996 Summer Olympics
Handball players at the 2000 Summer Olympics
Handball players at the 2004 Summer Olympics
Olympic gold medalists for Russia
Olympic bronze medalists for Russia
Sportspeople from Saint Petersburg
Olympic medalists in handball
Medalists at the 2004 Summer Olympics
Lesgaft National State University of Physical Education, Sport and Health alumni
Medalists at the 2000 Summer Olympics
Rhein-Neckar Löwen players